Keith Costigan is a former professional soccer player who now works as a television analyst and commentator for MLS Season Pass on Apple TV.

Costigan is originally from Dublin, Ireland where he played youth football for Irish youth clubs Vianney Boys, St. Kevin's Boys and Stella Maris. He also was enrolled in a full-time training course at Home Farm Costigan then spent two years in the League of Ireland with Bray Wanderers and Monaghan United Football Club. Costigan also had a brief spell with Luton Town but never came to terms on a contract.

Costigan decided to move onto the United States when offered a full soccer scholarship to Augusta State University and then later to California State University, Bakersfield. After completing his senior year at Bakersfield, Costigan signed a two-year contract with the Portland Timbers of the United Soccer Leagues. Costigan led the team in assists and minutes during his time with the club and also spent time with the Los Angeles Galaxy during the Timbers off-season. Costigan then rounded out his playing career with the Harrisburg City Islanders before starting his career with Fox Soccer Channel.

Costigan began with Fox as a wise-cracking barman on Fox Football Friday before moving on to co-host Super Saturday with Nick Webster. "I was always the joker of the teams I was a part of, and when I was at Portland I did a lot of interviews with media," says Costigan.

Costigan currently co-hosts Super Sunday Plus and can also be heard commentating on several games including World Cup Qualifiers, Europa League and Concacaf Champions League. Costigan also contributes to the Foxsoccer.com website with his weekly rankings and is also a regular contributor to The Kop Magazine, a monthly publication that is published in Europe and is aimed at Liverpool fans.

Costigan joined Seattle Sounders FC for the 2016 season as the play-by-play voice on their regional television broadcasts. He was also the coach of Cal FC, an amateur team based in California who had previously been managed by fellow Fox Sports commentator Eric Wynalda. Costigan left the Sounders broadcast team in 2023 to join Apple TV's national coverage of MLS.

References

External links
 Foxsoccer.com

Republic of Ireland association footballers
League of Ireland players
Bohemian F.C. players
Drogheda United F.C. players
Bray Wanderers F.C. players
Monaghan United F.C. players
Portland Timbers (2001–2010) players
Penn FC players
Living people
Cal State Bakersfield Roadrunners men's soccer players
A-League (1995–2004) players
Chivas USA non-playing staff
Stella Maris F.C. players
Home Farm F.C. players
Association footballers not categorized by position
Year of birth missing (living people)